Beth Anderson (born 1954) is an American singer and voice actress from Lexington, Kentucky.

Anderson's first notable release was the song "Dance Dance Dance" which appeared in the 1983 film Scarface as well as on its soundtrack.  "Dance Dance Dance" became iconic in the following years due to its use in the scene where Octavio the Clown is gunned down.  The song also appeared on the US 7" version of Debbie Harry's single "Rush Rush", another song from the Scarface soundtrack. "Dance Dance Dance" was also featured in the 2006 video game Scarface: The World Is Yours.

Anderson performed background vocals for Limahl's  No. 1 hit "The NeverEnding Story", the theme song for the 1984 eponymous film, though she was not credited as a featured artist. Her lyrics were recorded in America separately from Limahl's and accordingly she did not appear in the music video. One of Limahl's back-up singers, Mandy Newton, lip-synched Anderson's lyrics for the music video. Limahl and Anderson only performed the song together on a few occasions, including on the TV series Solid Gold and American Bandstand.

Anderson also performed the songs "Just Imagine (Way Beyond Fear)" for the 1984 film Thief of Hearts and "Angel Baby" for the 1989 film She's Out of Control.

Anderson has also worked as a voice actress. She has voiced characters in the animated films The Brave Little Toaster, The Swan Princess, Daisy-Head Mayzie, Babes in Toyland, An All Dogs Christmas Carol and the 1999 Disney film Tarzan.

References

External links
 Official website
 
 Beth Anderson at Discogs

1954 births
Living people
musicians from Lexington, Kentucky
American women pop singers
American voice actresses
21st-century American women singers
21st-century American singers